Frank McDonnell may refer to:

Frank McDonnell (Queensland politician) (1863–1928), Irish born Australian politician and draper
Frank McDonnell (Irish politician), Irish Fianna Fáil senator